Loren Linn AliKhan (born June 24, 1983)  is an American lawyer who serves as an associate judge of the District of Columbia Court of Appeals, the highest appellate court for the District of Columbia. She previously served as the solicitor general of the District of Columbia from 2018 to 2022.

Early life and education 

AliKhan is the daughter of immigrants from Pakistan. AliKhan received her Bachelor of Arts from Bard College at Simon's Rock in 2003 and her Juris Doctor from the Georgetown University Law Center in 2006.

Legal career 
After graduating from law school, AliKhan clerked for Judges Louis H. Pollak of the United States District Court for the Eastern District of Pennsylvania (2006-2007) and Thomas L. Ambro of the United States Court of Appeals for the Third Circuit (2007-2008). She was then a Bristow Fellow in the Office of the Solicitor General of the United States before joining the Washington, D.C. office of O'Melveny & Meyers. In 2013, AliKhan joined the Office of the District of Columbia Attorney General as a Deputy Solicitor General. In that role, she represented the District of Columbia's interests in appellate litigation before the District of Columbia Court of Appeals, United States Court of Appeals for the District of Columbia Circuit, Supreme Court of the United States, and other appellate tribunals.

On March 1, 2018, D.C. Attorney General Karl Racine appointed AliKhan as the District's second Solicitor General, succeeding Todd Kim.

D.C. court of appeals service 

On September 30, 2021, President Joe Biden nominated AliKhan to serve as an Associate Judge for the District of Columbia Court of Appeals. President Biden nominated AliKhan to the seat vacated by Judge John R. Fisher, who retired on August 22, 2020. On December 2, 2021, a hearing on her nomination was held before the Senate Homeland Security and Governmental Affairs Committee. Her nomination was reported to the full Senate on December 15, 2021. On February 2, 2022, the Senate invoked cloture on her nomination by a 55–40 vote. On February 8, 2022, the Senate confirmed her nomination by a 55–41 vote. She was sworn in by Chief Judge Anna Blackburne-Rigsby on February 18, 2022.

References

Year of birth uncertain
Living people
Place of birth missing (living people)
21st-century American women lawyers
21st-century American judges
21st-century American lawyers
American people of Pakistani descent
Bard College alumni
Georgetown University Law Center alumni
Judges of the District of Columbia Court of Appeals
Lawyers from Washington, D.C.
People associated with O'Melveny & Myers
Solicitors General of the District of Columbia
21st-century American women judges
1983 births